Insolentipalpus is a genus of moths of the family Erebidae. The genus was erected by George Thomas Bethune-Baker in 1908.

Species
Insolentipalpus acypera (Hampson, 1896)
Insolentipalpus biagi (Bethune-Baker, 1908)
Insolentipalpus mesogramma (Hampson, 1912)
Insolentipalpus ochreopunctata Bethune-Baker, 1908

References

Herminiinae